Out Time Days (or OTD) is an open-ended, computer moderated, science fiction, play-by-mail (PBM) wargame. It was published by Twin Engine Gaming in September 1985. Players role-played a time-traveller stranded on a planet called Kolob. Exploration, time travel, economics, and combat were part of gameplay. The game received generally positive reviews in various gaming magazines in the 1980s and 1990s, tying for 1st place in Paper Mayhem's Best PBM Game of 1997 list.

History and development
Out Time Days was a science fiction, role-playing, play-by-mail game published by Twin Engine Gaming of San Jose, CA. It was primarily computer moderated, and open-ended. Werner Freitas designed the game, enabling program modification over time. 

After more than a year of playtesting, the game was published in September 1985.  The gamemasters were Werner and Vicki Freitas.

Gameplay
Gameplay occurs on a planet called Kolob, populated by non-player characters and various races.  Reviewer J.W. Akers-Sassaman stated that players roleplay "human time travelers stranded on Kolob,
[who] are seen by the native populace as being the great saviors that will fulfill a mysterious 'prophecy' and
save the planet". Elements of gameplay included buildings and items, the latter created from sixteen types of building materials. Six factions were available for players to join.

After being taken unwillingly from Earth, players begin the game on Kolob alone with some basic equipment and provisions. Time traveling, combat, and economics were all game activities.

Order sheets were simple lined sheets of paper, enabling narrative, written turn orders.

Reception
A reviewer in the November–December 1986 issue of Paper Mayhem highlighted the game's careful design, stating that it took a "seldom blazed trail to smooth and realistic mechanics, extensive detail, and a high quality game". In a 1990 issue of Paper Mayhem, reviewer J.W. Akers-Sassaman gave the game "four thumbs up". In the same issue, Out Time Days placed No. 3 out of 57 games in Paper Mayhem's PBM Game Ratings list with a 7.694 rating out of a possible 9.

Out Time Days tied for No. 1 in Paper Mayhem's Best PBM Games of 1997 list. Tim Sullivan, the editor of the U.S. Edition of Flagship, stated that the game was "superlative" and "consistently deliver[ed] high quality adventure".

See also
 List of play-by-mail games

Notes

References

Bibliography

Further reading

 
  
  
  
  
  
 
  
 
  
  
  
  

Science fiction games
Multiplayer games
Play-by-mail games